Meri Biwi Ki Shaadi is a 1979 Bollywood comedy film directed by Rajat Rakshit. The film was remade in Kannada as Nan Hendthi Maduve (2003).

Plot
When he experiences chest pains, hopeless hypochondriac Bhagwant checks into the hospital for a checkup and overhears his doctor discussing the diagnosis of a terminally ill patient with an associate. Assuming he is the one scheduled to die, he asks his friend  to help him find a new husband for his wife Priya so he'll know she won't be alone once he's gone. He locates Priya's old college beau Fernandes. Meanwhile, Priya mistakes her husband's machinations for an attempt to cover up an extramarital affair and throws him out of the house.

Cast
Amol Palekar ... Bhagwant Kumar Bhartendu  
Ranjeeta Kaur ... Priya B. Bhartendu 
Ashok Saraf ... Advocate Venkat Vyas  
Datta Bhat ... Doctor Bhat
C. S. Dubey ... Banwari   
Nilu Phule ... Fernandes 
Raju Shrestha ... Bhagwant and Priya's Son

Music

References

External links
 

1979 films
Films scored by Usha Khanna
1970s Hindi-language films
1979 comedy films
Films about Indian weddings
Hindi films remade in other languages